Euglena sanguinea is a species of the genus Euglena. The red colour is due to the presence of astaxanthin and the cells can be populous enough to colour water red. The pigment is used to protect the chloroplasts from light that is too intense, but as the light levels change the cells can take on a green colour as the red pigment is moved to the centre of the cells. Euglena sanguinea is known to make the potent icthyotoxin euglenophycin.

References

Further reading

External links 

Euglenozoa
Articles containing video clips
Species described in 1830
Taxa named by Christian Gottfried Ehrenberg